Stormville Airport  was a public airport located one mile (2 km) northeast of the central business district (CBD) of Stormville, a hamlet located within the Town of East Fishkill in Dutchess County, New York, USA. This general aviation airport covered  and had one runway. It is no longer used as an airport, even though FAA sectional charts and NOTAMS do not yet indicate that it has closed. It now hosts the Stormville Flea Market several times a year.

Stormville was a privately owned, public use airport. Pete and Rose O'Brien ran the airport until their retirement. The current owner is their daughter Patricia Carnahan. There are no services for aircraft and no aircraft based there. Airport facilities such as runways, taxiways, wind sock, and pavement markings are in poor condition.

References

External links 

Stormville Airport as an airport
Stormville Airport as a flea market

Airports in New York (state)